This is a list of characters appearing in the animated series Kim Possible.

Overview

Team Possible

Kim Possible 

 Voiced by Christy Carlson Romano and Dakota Fanning (young)
 Portrayed by Sadie Stanley
Kimberly Ann "Kim" Possible is an Irish-American teenage girl who fights crime and saves the world on a regular basis while dealing with the normal challenges of being a teenager, such as winning cheerleading competitions, turning in her homework on time, and maintaining a love life. Her name is a play on the word "impossible." Kim has liked and known Ron Stoppable, her sidekick for most missions, since preschool. She has also completed missions with Wade, Monique, her brothers, and even her mother. In the movie So The Drama and in season four, Kim and Ron end up developing romantic feelings for each other and begin dating during their senior year. She has a fiery and headstrong personality that occasionally affects her work, yet she fulfills the role of a protagonist by using her intelligence and sensibility to 'save the day'. Though she struggles with embarrassment, her rivalry with Bonnie, and her shyness around her crushes, she more often than not has bouts of maturity, going so far as to act as Ron's conscience at times. She has a good relationship with her family members, though she is often annoyed by her brothers and embarrassed by her parents' antics.

Ron Stoppable
 Voiced by Will Friedle, Harrison Fahn (young)
 Portrayed by Sean Giambrone
Ronald "Ron" Stoppable has been best friends with Kim since preschool and they even live next door to each other. He serves as Kim's sidekick whenever they go on missions. Ron is a cowardly, goofy, clumsy, and accident-prone teenage boy, but he has saved the world on his own. He owns a pet naked mole-rat named Rufus who is also best friends with Ron and Kim and often helps them on their missions. In interviews, Bob Schooley and Mark McCorkle, the co-creators of Kim Possible, summed up Ron's role as comic relief for the entire series until the finale because, "He can't do anything." Ron is not as popular as Kim is at school and tends to be ridiculed and ignored by his peers. He does, however, join the football team his senior year, having previously served as team mascot, and is given the athletic nickname of "Unstoppable Stoppable". He has an adopted younger sister from Japan named Hana, who turns out to have mystical abilities of her own. In a few episodes, it is revealed that Ron and his family are devoutly Jewish.

His favorite restaurant is Bueno Nacho and he is the creator of the "Naco", which is a combination of nachos and a taco. He is afraid of monkeys, insects, and many other things, though his fears fluctuate as the series progresses as Ron matures. During the series, Ron demonstrates several talents which include being a chef, controlling his mystical monkey powers to a degree, and even sneaking into villains' lairs. In the movie, So The Drama, Ron realizes he has romantic feelings toward Kim and later confesses them to her. The two go to prom together and have their first kiss as an official romantic couple.

As the psychotic Zorpox the Conqueror, a name he came up with himself, Ron was an exceptionally brilliant villain when he was turned evil in a season three episode. His personality was almost entirely flipped and he actually became a very real and dangerous threat to everyone who dared to cross his path. When Ron was made evil by the Attitudinator, his skin eventually turned blue. Evil Ron was outstanding with using tools, building large and dangerous destructive devices, multitasking, and planning ahead. He also demonstrated the ability to predict Kim's actions, though that may have been due to being her best friend.

Early in the series, Ron gains the Mystical Monkey Powers while battling Lord Monkey Fist, using a series of ancient totems. Ron's control over the powers is shown as intermittent at best with Ron's Mystical Monkey Powers usually emerging in short bursts. Ron having these powers grants him the ability to wield the mystical Lotus Blade and according to an ancient prophecy, he is to be the Ultimate Monkey Master.

In season four, when they are officially dating, Ron struggles with his insecurity regarding Kim. He even goes as far as to steal her super-suit so he can become the school quarterback because of Bonnie's declaration cheerleaders have to date jocks. Though that backfires, he ends up as the football team's running back because of his "mad running skills" from all the running he does on missions. Ron ends up with a baby sister from Japan named Hana during season four. She has a mystical destiny, for which Ron is supposed to train her. During graduation, Ron is finally able to fully access his Mystical Monkey Powers, and as a result single-handedly defeats Warhok and Warmonga when even Kim and Shego combined could not. It is unknown if his control of his Mystical Monkey Powers remains or returns to how it was. However, his confidence is boosted by the event.

A running gag throughout the series is the tendency for Ron to always lose his pants.

Rufus

 Voiced by Nancy Cartwright
Rufus is Ron's pet, a naked mole-rat. He goes on nearly all missions and, because of his small size, often proves useful. Rufus' origin began long before Ron had even purchased him. At the age of four years, Ron had an imaginary friend named Rufus, who was, by Ron's description, "huge". Because of allergies, Ron's father would not allow him to have a pet with hair, so around sixth grade, he bought Rufus from a Smarty Mart.

Rufus is generally portrayed as pink, small and light, and very agile, which repeatedly proves useful. He shares several things in common with his owner: his love of Bueno Nacho food, his ability to eat with practically no concern about the food he is eating, sharing Ron's disgust for others, and an overall laid-back, casual attitude. However, unlike Ron, he has been known to abandon this attitude at crucial times, often using quicker thinking than his owner. Rufus tends to display frustration with Ron when he uses him in an embarrassing way or fails to give him due credit. However, he has generally stuck by Ron in virtually every situation, and though he does not have the same fear, has the same overall dislike for monkeys. Rufus communicates with Ron through a series of squeaks and hisses which Ron seems to understand. Rufus also possesses mystical monkey powers as he was in Ron's pocket when he got his. He has never used them beyond displaying a greater degree of mastery of Yamanouchi ninja training than Ron, as well as once controlling the Lotus Blade.

In A Sitch In Time, a version of Rufus from the future named Rufus 3000 visits Kim, asking her help in saving the future from Shego. Able to talk with clear human speech (voiced by Michael Dorn), he refers to himself as Rufus 3000 because he is the 3000th version made of the original "Rufus Prime". He displays Rufus' fondness for cookies, and asks Rufus what the meaning of life is, to which the mole rat replies, "Cheese!" Rufus 3000 is the leader of a team of genetically altered naked-mole rats, who, like himself, are very muscular in appearance. He and the original Rufus lead them against Shego and her allies in the climax of the film. Rufus 3000 appears in A Sitch In Time as an information provider to Kim and occasional aid in the first two, but only assumes a main role in the final part.

Wade
 Voiced by Tahj Mowry, Michael Clarke Duncan (future in Kim Possible: A Sitch In Time)
 Portrayed by Issac Ryan Brown
 is a 10-year-old genius who runs Kim Possible's website, supplies her with various gadgets, gives her missions through her "Kimmunicator," and arranges her transportation. On rare occasions he has even gone on missions with Kim. He often relays information to her, searches for information for her, and performs programming feats. It is never explained how he met Kim and Ron, or how he eventually became their partner.

According to Kim, Wade completed his high school and college education in eight months. He spends his time in his bedroom in his parents' home in front of the computer with the lights off. He is a master of the role-playing game Everlot. In one episode he develops a crush on Monique, after seeing her in person for the first time, leading him to create a love ray and trying to force her to be his girlfriend. In the end, he learns his lesson and quickly recovers from his minor heartbreak as he develops a crush on a genius girl named Olivia sitting in Bueno Nacho. That eventually does not work out either as she created a love ray herself, much to Wade's chagrin. Wade also invented Kim's technologically advanced battle suit.

For the first two seasons, and most of the third season, Wade is never seen outside his room, until the episode "Team Impossible". When Team Impossible overloads his computer system with a power spike, this angers him so much that he personally arrives on scene, and vents on the three members of the team. In the fourth season, Wade ventures out of his room to give Kim new inventions, and on at least one occasion, to return Kim's battle suit to her after repairs and upgrades were made to it. A running gag throughout the series is that Wade has secretly placed a tracking microchip on Ron, although he tries to avoid answering when questioned about this.

In A Sitch in Time, future Wade, now a large muscular man, is the leader of the anti-Shego resistance.

Eric/Athena the Synthodrone
 Voiced by Ricky Ullman (as Eric)
 Portrayed by Ciara Riley Wilson (as Athena)
His purpose is to keep Kim preoccupied socially so that Drakken's plan to take over the world will not be interrupted. He is destroyed by Rufus in revenge for calling naked mole rats "gross". A female version of Eric, renamed , is introduced in the 2019 live-action film Kim Possible, depicted as a bōjutsuka expert android built by Drakken to become friends with Kim and Ron before stealing the former's motivational essence and transferring it into Drakken with his brain-modulating device. As Kim short-circuits the transfer machine, Dr. Drakken is de-aged into a pre-adolescent version of himself. Despite Kim's insistence that she save herself, Athena stays behind to turn off the now-unstable machine. The lair explodes and Athena is presumed killed, but it is revealed that she has survived the explosion. Kim and Ron take her home to be repaired and programmed to be a hero alongside themselves.

Family members

The Possibles

Dr. James Timothy Possible
 Voiced by Gary Cole
 Portrayed by Matthew Clarke
Kim, Jim, and Tim's father is an astrophysicist and a rocket scientist. His full name is revealed by Big Daddy Brotherson in the movie "So the Drama". It is revealed in season four he was a graduate of MIST, or the Middleton Institute of Science and Technology, and that he enjoyed writing fan-fiction for the in-series Captain Constellation TV franchise. In the Lilo & Stitch crossover episode Rufus, Kim mentions James "knows the senator of Hawaii". He does not like it when Kim is with boys, often saying: "As long as she is not with boys, I am OK." However, he is fine with next door neighbor Ron who has known Kim, and been close friends with her, for an extremely long time.

Dr. Ann Possible
 Voiced by Jean Smart
 Portrayed by Alyson Hannigan
Kim, Jim, and Tim's mother is not only a neurosurgeon, usually referred to as a brain surgeon in the series, but also a caring mother to Kim, and seems to be more understanding toward her daughter. In season four her name is revealed to be Ann Possible by her brother-in-law Slim Possible in "Graduation Part 1". It is also revealed in season four that she was a graduate of the University of Upperton. In the episode "Mother's Day" she goes on a mission with Kim and saves her from being swallowed by a glob of green goo by using her Kimmunicator to send high-frequency pulses to attack it.

Often, when Kim calls her mother for advice, she is currently in surgery as a running gag, but she always manages to talk with Kim during surgery, though Kim feels disgusted about it.

Jim and Tim Possible
 Voiced by Shaun Fleming (first voice), Spencer Fox (second voice), Freddie Prinze Jr. (future in A Sitch in Time)
 Portrayed by Owen and Connor Fielding
Kim's brilliant but annoying younger twin brothers, whom she often refers to as the tweebs (twin dweebs). They are both named after their father. Because of their youth at the beginning of the series, they sometimes neglect to consider the consequences of their actions, such as trying to duplicate one of Adrena Lynn's extreme stunts, which left them with significant injuries. Their catchphrase is in the twinspeak language they invented, one saying "Hicka-bicka-boo", followed by the response "Hooo-Sha". When Kim is a senior, the two go to Middleton High School because they skipped grades. They become the Middleton Pep Puppies after Ron joins the football team and can no longer be their mascot. Ron is initially unhappy with this, but accepts it and even gives them a can of mouth foam to use.

Throughout the series, they display a talent for inventing and often use Kim's stuff to create their own inventions. They also help her fix and upgrade the beat-up car their dad gave her, and program it to increase its speed, endurance, and power. Despite their obvious intellect, Kim has trouble seeing them as anything more than annoying goof-offs, believing them incapable of some of the things they have achieved, such as building a hand-held Silicon Phase Disruptor, believed by Drakken and other scientists to be impossible, or skipping grades to enter Middleton High as freshmen at the age of thirteen. However, there have also been times when Kim showed both true affection and appreciation for them and their skills.

Nana Possible
 Voiced by Debbie Reynolds
 Portrayed by Connie Ray
Kim, Jim, Tim, and Joss's overprotective paternal grandmother. She is first mentioned in the episode "Downhill" and first appeared in "The Golden Years" where she initially seemed to be the typical fussy, old-fashioned and "fuddy-duddy" grandmother. But, it turns out she is as skilled a fighter as Kim, even more so, having trained in "Pang Lang Quan Kung Fu" in a Shaolin Monastery, been a top aviatrix, and was the first woman to finish the Navy's Basic Underwater Demolition Course (BUDS, also known as SEAL Training). Kim never knew about this until they were pitted against each other by Drakken.

Larry
 Voiced by Brian Posehn
Kim, Jim, and Tim's cousin. He is also friends with Ron. An avid computer geek, he loves video games and attends the Robot Rumble. He also has a slight crush on Bonnie, who he compares to the Queen in one of his games. His last name is never given in the show so there is no way to know if he is from Kim's father's side, or her mother's. However, as shown in "Attack of the Killer Bebes" there is only one "Possible" in the Middleton phone book, suggests that either his surname is not Possible, or that his family does not live in Middleton.

June
 Voiced by Mary Jo Catlett
Kim, Jim, and Tim's aunt. She is Larry's overprotective mother. She loves her son and she does not understand any of his interests. When she witnesses villains fighting, June fails to comprehend what is happening.

Joss Possible
 Voiced by Tara Strong
Joss is Kim, Jim, and Tim's cousin on their father's side and the daughter of "Slim" Possible. She makes only a single in person appearance in the show. Initially, she  is so overboard with hero-worshiping Kim, dressing like her, knowledgeable about every facet of her life and missions, and even having home-made versions of her gadgets, that Kim feels uncomfortable around her. However, by the end of Kim's visit to the Lazy C Ranch, Joss has shifted her entire focus onto Ron, having recognized the true worth of being brave is how he will forge ahead into dangerous situations despite all his fears and neuroses.

"Slim" Possible
 Voiced by Kevin Michael Richardson
James Possible's older brother, Joss's father, and Kim, Jim, and Tim's uncle. Much to James' distaste, he refers to his younger brother by a childhood nickname of "squirt". Slim is also very fond of Ann Possible. The whereabouts of his wife, Joss's mother, are never addressed. He appears in "Showdown at the Crooked D" and "Graduation". A cowboy by choice and lifestyle, he owns the Lazy C Ranch in Montana, which is apparently more than it appears as he has a high tech control center tied into his own system of launched satellites, as well as having a contingent of "cybertronic" robotic horses. There is no sign or mention of living breathing livestock. One summer Drakken had set an evil scheme in motion at a neighboring property named the Crooked D Ranch which the Possible Clan was able to thwart.

The Stoppables
Ron's family, composed of: father (who works as an actuary), mother, and later, adopted little sister Hana.

Mr. Stoppable
 Voiced by Elliott Gould.
Ron and Hana's father who is an actuary. Because of his pet fur allergy, Ron was never allowed to have a pet until he bought Rufus. Ron once wanted to be an actuary, but then Mr. Stoppable showed him how risk could lead to rewards. He also showed his skills in "Mathter and Fervent" when he used his actuarial skills to defeat the math villain terrorizing Ron. In his own words to the villain, "I did the math." As a result, he became the subject of Ron's hero paper which gets an "A+" from Mr. Barkin, who exclaims: "Your Dad rocks!"

Mrs. Stoppable
 Voiced by Andrea Martin
Ron and Hana's mother, who seems to have a distant relationship with Ron. Her job is unknown, but it is shown in A Sitch in Time that she had to relocate to Norway to be closer to the home office. As with Mr. Stoppable her way of breaking news to her son is to do it and tell him later. Their catchphrase is: "This is our way of telling you."

Hana Stoppable
 Voiced by Grey DeLisle
Hana Stoppable is Ron's Japanese adopted baby sister. Her name is Japanese for "flower". She apparently is from the Yamanouchi Clan as it was Sensei who brokered the adoption, and later Yori claimed Hana was "like a sister". At first Ron is resentful of her and how his parents sprung her on him as a surprise, before  discovering she is a prophesied weapon called The Han. Eventually Ron warms up to her, fully accepting his role as her big brother. Her mystical and martial arts skills grow until she finally defeats Yono the Destroyer in "Oh No, Yono". As an adopted member of the family, she is most likely raised Jewish.

Shaun
 Voiced by Tara Strong.

Shaun is Ron and Hana's seven year old cousin. He appears as a troublemaker who torments Ron at family functions. He owns a pet iguana who apparently has made numerous attempts to eat Rufus. Ron's complaints about his cousin have mostly been ignored because Shaun is younger. Ron is unable to ditch him until Kim agrees to be his date at his cousin Reuben's wedding, thus sparing him from having to sit at "the kid's table". Ron also resorts to using the Attitudinator device to make Shaun less annoying and more polite.

Reuben Stoppable
Reuben is the bridegroom at the wedding in "Bad Boy". He appears briefly on screen and can be seen pulling his bride, Miss Starter (voiced by Grey DeLisle), to safety. He is a cousin of Ron and Hana though on which side of the family is not specified. Since the wedding is specified as "the Stoppable-Starter wedding", he is presumably from the father's side.

Other

Miriam "Mim" Possible and Jonathan "Jon" Stoppable
Mim and Jon may be Kim and Ron's ancestors seen during a shared dream sequence.

According to the episode, Miriam, or "Mim" for short, is a highly respected reporter for turn-of-the-century Middleton's local newspaper. However, while she was reporting on the science exhibition at the world's fair, the new invention of the "Electro-Static Illuminator" was stolen, and Mim was blamed for the theft. It was not until the modern-day Kim Possible heard about her "black sheep" ancestor that it was revealed that Mim was framed for the theft by the ancestors of Shego and Drakken, Miss Go and Bartholomew Lipsky. Mim's closest friend, Jonathan "Jon" Stoppable was a detective, who was every bit as clumsy and scatterbrained as his descendant. He was the only person who believed that Mim was innocent, and he tried desperately, but unsuccessfully, to prove it. Jon was the biggest and only fan of the concept of the taco when it was first unveiled at the fair, which parallels Ron's love for Bueno Nacho fast food.

Jon Stoppable makes two appearances apart from "Rewriting History". He can be seen holding a test tube as part of a Middleton Days float in "Emotion Sickness", and Ron, dressed as Jon, can be seen during a faux-flashback by Ron during "Ron Millionaire". Kim, dressed as Miriam, can also be seen during the faux-flashback.

While the ending showed Kim and Ron waking from the shared dream in the Tri-City Museum, Kim's clothing was not the same as at the beginning of the episode; this means the episode opened with the dream already in progress and, though a float with Jon's likeness was seen outside of the episode, the existence of all the other "ancestral" characters in the episode, including Mim, is debatable.

Wade's Mother
 Voiced by Roz Ryan
Wade's mother appears sporadically throughout the series. Her most notable appearance is in the episode "Mother's Day", when Wade treats her to a celebration in his room, complete with takeout French cuisine and even a holographic beach.

Wade's Father, Lontaine
Voiced by Mr. T

Wade's father is mentioned a couple times in the series but never makes an appearance. His name, Lontaine, was mentioned by Wade's mother in "The Cupid Effect". In "Crush", his socks are stated as being integral to Wade's super-stink formula.

Connie and Lonnie Rockwaller
 Voiced by Jennifer Hale (Connie), Grey DeLisle (Lonnie)
Two older sisters of Bonnie Rockwaller. Taller and curvaceous, the family resemblance both physical and attitude is clear. First alluded to in "Hidden Talent", when Bonnie mentioned her "older sibs" having won the Middleton High talent show the previous four years in a row, they make their first physical appearance in "Bonding". It is strongly implied that Bonnie's attitudes and sour disposition may stem from their treatment of her; they claim that Connie "got all the brains", Lonnie "got all the looks", while Bonnie "got the rest". Their interaction with each other, moving and speaking in sync, finishing each other's sentences, and leaning against one another while laughing hint they might be fraternal twins. Lonnie also attempts to appear smart, but is actually not as smart as she tries to appear: after Connie corrects Bonnie about Cincinnati not being a country, Lonnie wrongly identifies France as a city.

Allies and friends

Global Justice

Dr. Betty Director
 Voiced by Felicity Huffman
Betty Director, more commonly known as Dr. Director, is the head of the worldwide espionage organization known as the Global Justice Network (GJ). She is in charge of addressing any threats to the world that fall outside the scope of normal law enforcement groups. However, even an organization with some of the world's finest scientists, weapons, and agents requires some help from time to time. And Dr. Director is not too proud to call in reinforcements if it means the job gets done, which is where Kim Possible comes in. However, being a top-secret organization, even asking for help has to be handled in a discreet way, whether it is sucking Kim into a trap door through a series of transport tubes. or arranging a phony crime to lure her to a meeting site. She first introduces Kim to the Global Justice Network in a case that leads to Kim's first encounter with Duff Killigan. She later calls in Kim and Ron to assess a phenomenon GJ scientists dub "the Ron Factor" (the gist being that Ron's chaotic nature is the real reason for Kim's success in saving the world and Dr. Director wants to see if GJ could harness that chaos, eventually deemed as a "non-factor"). She has subsequently stays behind the scenes for the most part, although Kim has other dealings with Global Justice, usually in the form of rides to her destinations and backup on missions.

As the head of a global organization, Dr. Director has very little hands-on involvement in GJ's cases, but on the rare occasions when she has had to do so, she has proven she can hold her own in a fight. Dr. Director is bound and determined to bring down Gemini and his organization, WEE (the Worldwide Evil Empire). But rather than a war of two tactical geniuses, their battles are really more reminiscent of a kindergarten slap fight, since their conflict is really nothing more than a case of sibling rivalry run amok. Dr. Director is instantly recognizable by her eyepatch, reminiscent of the Marvel Comics character, Nick Fury. Gemini wears one too, and his name is another reference to Nick Fury, whose brother became the villain Scorpio. However, it is unclear whether either twin wears it because of an actual eye injury or whether they are just making a fashion statement.

Team Impossible
 Voiced by: (in order) Gary Dourdan, Eric Close, and Adam Rodriguez
Dash DaMont, Crash Cranston, and Burn Berman are the three huge and fearsome members of Team Impossible. They are mentioned in "A Sitch in Time" by Mr. McHenry, who, in need of aid, tries to summon them on their website, but a typo got him Kim Possible's instead. They charge anyone they save a lot of money. Eventually, the team tries to stop Kim from saving the world by removing all of her transportation. As a bonus, they unknowingly spike Wade's computer when he tries to trace them. When Kim and Ron arrive, Team Impossible decide to deal with them personally. After threatening them, Wade manages to convince them to join Global Justice and become non-profit.

Dash appears to be the team leader. He is a survival specialist and is multilingual.
Crash is the team's driver. He is also skilled in emergency medicine.
Burn is the team's accountant. He claims that he crunches a lot more than numbers. After the team became non-profit, Burn aided James Possible in doing his taxes.

Will Du
 Voiced by B. D. Wong
The top agent of Global Justice, Will Du was brought on by Dr. Director to work alongside Kim when she is recruited to rescue a former weapons researcher from Duff Killigan. This was an assignment that Will particularly resents, since he sees world saving as a "professional's" job and does not appreciate an "amateur" like Kim horning in on what he feels is his jurisdiction. This caused Kim no end of grief, since she spends more time fighting with Will than with Killigan himself. However, they eventually manage to find a small amount of synergy, and in the end, are able to stop Killigan from turning the entire world into his own private golf course.

A consummate professional, Will takes his job as an agent of Global Justice very seriously. So seriously, in fact, he does not seem to realize it is a job he is not particularly good at. He is well educated, speaking fourteen languages, and academically competent.

Yamanouchi
Yamanouchi is a secret ninja school, located on top of a mountain in Japan. It was founded by Toshimiru, a master of Tai Sheng Pek Kwar, better known as Monkey Kung Fu, who carved the school out of the mountain using only a single weapon: a shapeshifting sword called the Lotus Blade. Since its creation in 338 AD, the school has guarded the blade, which can only fully be used in the hands of one who has been touched by Mystical Monkey Power.

This school, and some of its members had a role in a story arc during the series.

Master Sensei
 Voiced by George Takei
The Headmaster of Yamanouchi, Sensei is the traditional "wise old master" archetype. His name can be translated into English as both "Teacher" and "Master", making the title redundant. He possesses a wide range of abilities, a product of his many years of training and experience. As a martial artist, he is quite powerful, regardless of his advanced years and small stature. He also seems to possess a wide range of spiritual abilities, such as astral projection and the ability to levitate. Despite these skills, Sensei seems to prefer not involving himself directly in conflicts unless he has to.

Sensei is the one who initially arranged for Ron to be part of the transfer program to Japan, which would bring him to the Yamanouchi, to protect the Lotus Blade from Monkey Fist. He was also the one who secretly arranged the adoption for Ron's new baby sister Hana, so she could be prepared for her eventual showdown with Yono the Destroyer. When the world was in danger from the Lorwardians, Sensei apparently sensed what was coming as he tried to warn Ron about it, but Ron misunderstood his message. Later, he appears to Ron when Kim and Shego are knocked out and helps him get the courage to summon the full strength and power of his dormant tremendous Mystical Monkey Power, informing him of his role as the Ultimate Monkey Master and assuring him it is his destiny which he is finally ready for.

Yori
 Voiced by Keiko Agena
Yori is a student from Yamanouchi and a highly skilled ninja. She first appears in "Exchange" when she is sent to receive Ron and guide him to the Yamanouchi School, and serves as a support for him during that episode, developing a strong bond with him. She later reappears in a few future episodes. Yori is usually calm, even in dangerous situations, and kind to the point of showing more concern for others than for herself.

As a fighter she is very reliable, but has demonstrated a preference to act as a subordinate rather than a leader, and has also shown the typical Japanese value of teamwork over individuality. Yori is a better fighter than Kim; in "Oh No! Yono!" when the villain Yono the Destroyer turns Kim to stone he is unable to petrify Yori. She is also very optimistic and believes a lot in her friends. From her introduction, Yori has appeared as a potential love interest for Ron, piquing his romantic interest at first sight and gradually develops more-than-friendly feelings for him. This is confirmed Yori's second appearance in the episode "Gorilla Fist". Ron is completely oblivious to her romantic feelings toward him, to the point that Kim has to spell it out for him - Yori "really liked-liked" him. However, this relationship is exiled during the series' fourth season since Ron has starting dating Kim. Yori does not express much concern about this development, stating that Kim and Ron have a destiny together. A running gag is that Yori talks very much about honor, to Ron's chagrin, such as when he faces a long walk and asks for a ride, Yori says it was "his honor to walk".

Team Go
A family and team of superheroes who protect Go City. They are also Shego's brothers. Their names are based on personal pronouns with the "go" added at the end. They originally appear in the episodes "Go Team Go" during season two, and later return in season four in "Stop Team Go" and "Mathter and Fervent", the latter features only Hego. The siblings got their powers after a multi-hued "comet"-like object crashed into their tree house when they were young. They reside in Go Tower, a building designed around the letters "G" and "O", which may be an allusion to DC Comics's Teen Titans's Titan Tower. Like Kim, they also have a set of supervillains they regularly fight, such as arch-foes, Aviarius, The Mathter, and Electronique.

Before Shego quit, Team Go originally had five members; go is the number five in Japanese.

Hego
 Voiced by Christopher McDonald
Practically the leader of the group, with the blue glow power, and super strength, Hego, the oldest of the siblings, has an alter ego as a Bueno Nacho manager with black hair and Clark Kent-style glasses. His hair is dark blue. His personality is somewhat of a parody of Superman's, being the most overtly "super-heroic" but also childishly bossy and take-charge. He has a tendency to make horrible jokes and puns—such as calling Team Go's teamwork "Go-operation" and saying "Looks like this bird is ready for his cage" every time he captures Aviarius—and appears quite unable to tell when they fall flat. He sincerely believes that despite her actions, Shego is still a good person, only to be proven wrong when she betrays and blasts him. It is such behavior that seems to make Hego the brother Shego is most annoyed by. In fact, after only five minutes in Hego's presence, Ron says: "I'm starting to see why Shego split."

Mego
 Voiced by Jere Burns
Mego has a purple suit, purple skin, purple hair, and a glow power which gives him the ability to shrink at will. He is the second oldest brother after Hego; he may also be older than Shego, or possibly even be her twin. His power combined with his coloration draws some comparisons to the DC Comics superhero Shrinking Violet of the Legion of Super-Heroes. His name may also be a reference to the Mego Corporation's line of 8-inch action figures. He possesses a large and easily wounded ego, and is rather defensive of his seemingly useless power. After the team reunites, he expresses a desire to be the leader. Because of Mego's self-absorbed nature and easily triggered annoyance, his attitude seems to be the closest to Shego's. However, Shego still gets annoyed with Mego's inability to see past his own nose.

The Wego twins
 Voiced by Fred Savage
Rounding out the team are the Wego twins, who are the youngest of the group. Rather happy-go-lucky, they seemingly take every twist and turn in stride. They have the twinspeak tendency to finish each other's sentences. Wielding the red power, they have all the color coordination that goes with it; although their 'red-shifted' skin-tones are fairly close to that of normal redheaded human ruddiness as compared to Mego and Shego's more extreme and distinctive colorations. Their glow gives them the ability to duplicate themselves. It is unclear if the Wego twins were born twins, or if they were originally only one person and became two people in the impact event which gave them their superpowers. Shego has displayed less annoyance with the twins than the rest of her family, working alongside Hego and Mego to save them.

Felix Renton
 Voiced by Jason Marsden
More Ron's friend than Kim's, Felix is an easygoing boy who enjoys video games and basketball. The fact that he is paralyzed from the waist down does not stop him from enjoying life, especially since his mother, who is a cyber-robotics employee at the Middleton space center, tricked out his wheelchair to handle his basic needs. This gives Felix the ability to do things most people can not do, such as flying around. Felix often jokes about his situation, much to Kim's discomfort. In the beginning, her efforts were repeatedly met with failure. While playing basketball with Felix, still uptight Kim insistently tells Ron that he "can't win" (Ron was "two buckets down" against Felix), but Ron misses the point she is making that he should not win against someone with a handicap, replies all he needs is more focus. Eventually, inspired by Ron's mellow attitude, and especially discovering that Felix is more than capable of handling life from a wheelchair, Kim soon relaxes.

Felix is a good friend and supports Ron in the two episodes he plays a major role in, "Motor Ed" and "Steal Wheels". Both episodes involve Motor Ed, who claims he could have handled Kim the first time had Felix not interfered, and Felix's wheelchair's capabilities prove essential to success.

In the season four series finale episode, "Graduation", Felix is shown as class valedictorian, and that he is dating Zita Flores.

M.C. Honey
 Voiced by Sherri Shepherd
A rapper loosely based on Queen Latifah, MC Lyte, and other female rappers. She gives Kim a ride in her yacht as thanks for retrieving her demo tape when it was stolen in "Hidden Talent"'. She makes reappearances in "Rappin' Drakken" and "Trading Faces" when she is also framed by new villainess Camille Leon.

Britina
 Voiced by Tara Strong
Britina is a teen pop-music singing sensation, and as such, she has a line of merchandise like her own magazine and dolls. Like most pop singers, she is fodder for the tabloids and has even dated Oh Boyz! singer Nicky Nick, but they have since broken up. As her portmanteau name indicates, Britina is an allusion to real-life pop singers Britney Spears and Christina Aguilera, with her relationship with Nicky Nick being reminiscent of that of Spears and Justin Timberlake.

Kim once helped Britina when her show in Chicago caught fire, so she, like many others Kim has helped, gives her rides to other missions, and is one of the few characters who cover this role. Although Britina appear once more in "Trading Faces", where Kim helps to clear the pop-star arrested on theft charges when the actual thief is Camille Leon, her pop culture presence surfaced again in "Queen Bebe" when a shortage of Britina dolls nearly causes a worldwide panic among pre-teen girls.

Nakasumi and Miss Kyoko
 Voiced by Clyde Kusatsu (Nakusumi), Lauren Tom (Miss Kyoko)
Nakasumi is the top toy developer in the world. Miss Kyoko is his ever-present secretary and personal assistant. He is the victim of theft by Drakken and Shego in "Crush". Fortunately, Kim recovers what was stolen, and in return, Nakasumi gives her a ride in "A Very Possible Christmas" and "So the Drama", the latter once again is a major part of the plot. At first, it appears Nakasumi can understand yet is unable to speak English, but eventually it is revealed he can indeed speak English, but prefers to whispering in Miss Kyoko's ear. One of Nakasumi's characters, Z-Boy, makes several cameos as toys and posters.

Monique
 Voiced by Raven-Symoné, Vivica A. Fox (future in A Sitch in Time)
One of the most visible recurring characters of Kim Possible. Her surname is never revealed, possibly a nod to her voice actress, Raven-Symoné, who is generally known by just her first name. The character's design has evolved through the seasons, with the most notable change being to her eyes, which pass from small pupils to wider and fuller brown eyes.

Monique is smart and hip. She usually speaks in a style which Kim describes as "Monique-speak". Monique also likes to talk in acronyms, such as "NBF" (new best friend) and "GF" (girlfriend). Little is known about her family or personal life, but she complains of having bad luck with boyfriends and she has a brother who gets her hooked on wrestling, as well as a father who plays golf, as she said in "A Sitch in Time".

She is considered Kim's best female friend, giving her level-headed advice about school and life, and serves as a good counterbalance to Ron's out-of-touch eccentricities. On a few occasions, Monique assists Kim on her missions, even though she lacks fighting skills. Her passion and expertise in fashion also make her important when the time comes to make Kim's new mission uniform.

Amelia
 Voiced by Carly Pope and Tara Strong
Amelia is a minor character seen in seasons one and two. A senior, it is implied that she is the school's beauty queen until she presumably graduates after season two. Bonnie is known to save her seats at lunch ("Animal Attraction"). Amelia constantly brushes off Ron's attempts at flirting, but welcomes him into her popular circle during the episodes "All the News" and "The New Ron", and accepts money from him in  "Ron Millionaire". In the episode "Animal Attraction" she turns out to be a red otter and her soul mate is the pink sloth (which was what Ron's animal was). In "All the News" it is also mentioned she briefly dated – and dumped – Brick Flagg, and in "Triple S" she briefly appeared in a photo.

Bobo the Chimpanzee
Wannaweep's camp mascot, Bobo the Chimpanzee debuted in the second episode of season one, and returned in the 13th episode. Since then he has appeared, or has been directly/indirectly referenced, in a number of episodes. He is unique in the franchise in that, while he is a recurring tertiary character, he has only ever been seen during flashbacks describing Ron's unpleasant experiences at Camp Wannaweep.

Brick Flagg
 Voiced by Rider Strong
Brick is the star quarterback for the Middleton High School football team. Despite being the stereotypical "dumb jock", he is not a "school bully" and is actually a genuinely nice guy who normally does not make a point of throwing his weight around, except for one occasion in a second-season episode ("Exchange") when he initiates a confrontation with Japanese exchange student Hirotaka.

Bonnie Rockwaller is his on-again, off-again girlfriend for most of the second and third seasons. His love interests during their off- periods  include Kim ("All the News"), Amelia, and Monique display a return interest (So the Drama). However, in the fourth-season episode, Homecoming Upset, it is revealed he dumped Bonnie and during a phone conversation he tells Ron he has no intention of resuming a relationship with Bonnie, causing Ron to remark that "college has actually made him smarter."

He makes a brief cameo in A Sitch in Time as one of Shego's slaves. This version of Brick Flagg has become overweight and appears to have a lack of hygiene.

Doctor Cyrus Bortel
 Voiced by Enrico Colantoni
A selfish inventor, Doctor Bortel falls into a gray area in the show's universe of "good guys." Bortel developed the Moodulators and Mind Control Chips, both of which affect Kim and Shego in "The Twin Factor" and "Emotion Sickness". Though he seems to have no evil intentions himself, his inventions have wreaked havoc in Kim and Ron's lives with their "ferociously unethical" applications – a fact which does not stop Kim from using them on her brothers. Considering there is no stated purpose for making the Mind Control Chips, and the "Moodulator" devices for online auction to the highest-bidding "government agency", his motives appear to be mainly profit-driven. That his inventions' negative effects have been criminally misused by others, usually Drakken, is never addressed and is Cyrus never shown to truly face any consequences for his projects. He is a tad disorganized as seen in "Emotion Sickness" when he fail to notice the presence of the Kimmunicator in his lab – Ron having accidentally dropped it – until it took off.

Doctor Vivian Frances Porter
 Voiced by Shawnee Smith
Vivian is a very intelligent and beautiful woman suspected of stealing a project from the Middleton Space Center. She turns out to be innocent when it is revealed she is a brilliant, noted robotics authority with a doctorate and her research was stolen by co-worker Dr Fen. She had hidden her true identity behind her initials as "Doctor V. F. Porter" because it was her experience that she was not taken seriously as a female scientist who looked like a fashion model. Chief among Vivian's inventions is Oliver, a bearding robotic "boyfriend",  which like the rest of her projects is equipped with advanced technology such as artificial intelligence. In the end she is offered a job at the Middleton Space Center's robotics lab by James Possible.

François
 Voiced by Rob Paulsen
A French hairstylist who cuts and styles Ron's hair in "The New Ron". He later appears in "Rufus in Show" when he lends Kim and Ron his prize-winning pedigree poodle when they need to infiltrate an exclusive dog show, and in "Two to Tutor" as one of the targets of a string of heists committed by Shego and Señor Senior Junior.

Hirotaka
 Voiced by Brian Tochi
A tall and handsome Japanese exchange student in "Exchange" as Ron goes to Japan in his place. Riding a sport motorcycle and exuding J-Pop coolness, he quickly gains popularity with the girls which leads to a confrontation with Brick Flagg. He wins that fight without open violence or sweat by using secret Yamanouchi ninja skills. Intrigued that Kim knows Mantis style Kung Fu, he engages in a brief sparring of styles with her, leaving Kim winded but again Hirotaka does not break a sweat. Both Kim  and Monique develop crushes on him, even going so far as to fight over him, but later reconcile upon finding out he considers Bonnie as his "number one girlfriend".

Josh Mankey
 Voiced by A.J. Trauth
Kim's former love interest and major crush. Ron dislikes him as his last name is similar to the word monkey, as well as jealousy due to Kim's crush on Josh. Being an artist, musician, and overall popular student with a laid-back easy personality, Kim had a crush on him. In season three it is revealed that Josh and Kim went their separate ways, with him seen with Tara for a period of time.

Ned
 Voiced by Eddie Deezen
Ned works at the Middleton Bueno Nacho store #582 as the assistant manager, although he was once demoted and Ron promoted in his place ("Bueno Nacho"). Ned also has active interests in Robot Rumble ("Grudge Match"), comic books, and role-playing games ("Larry's Birthday"). He also has a sharp sense of fashion having once seen a picture of a leather jacket which Kim had posted at the store as her own inspiration for working, and "just had to have it". He seems to be somewhat good friends with Ron.

Elsa Cleeg
 Voiced by Wendie Malick
Elsa Cleeg is a famous fashion critic with her own television fashion report program or segment which Monique watches religiously. Elsa knows "what's hot and what is not... what's here today, and gone tomorrow". Elsa is an influential authority on fashion, even influencing Club Banana. Elsa was struck by the aesthetics of Kim's mission clothes to create the "KimStyle"  nationwide clothing sensation, including spin-off clothing lines "KimForHim" and one for pets. Made fun of for not being able to properly pull off her own look, an annoyed Kim could not wait for the fad to end, which it soon did; eventually backfiring against Kim when, in the season four episode "Clothes Minded", she could no longer purchase her original mission clothes. This forced Kim to have a new outfit designed for her in the same episode.

Oh Boyz
 Voiced by (in order) Lance Bass, Joey Fatone, Jason Marsden, and Justin Shenkarow
The Oh Boyz band consists of Robby, Nicky Nick, Ryan, and Dexter, who form a popular boy band whose fame suddenly vanished, leaving them with Ron as their only fan. They were on the verge of breaking up when the Señor Seniors kidnapped them with the intention of putting Junior in the group to help him fulfill his dream of becoming an international pop sensation, accidentally snagging Ron along with them. While breaking out, they use their dancing skills to evade laser cannons firing at them, finally putting aside their arguments and learning to work together as a group again to help Kim and Ron capture the villains (the only time on the show they were ever captured together). After learning how their manager did not care about getting them back, they fired him and hired Rufus in his place. During the period they were missing, the group's popularity enjoyed a revival due to a resurgence of their music on radio, retrospective television specials, and investigative reports about their disappearance.

Nicky Nick was known to have had a relationship and breakup with fellow pop singer Britina.

Pain King and Steel Toe
 Voiced by (in order) Bill Goldberg and Test
The top-billing, star wrestlers of the GWA (Global Wrestling Association) who are bitter rivals in the ring, but are actually good friends when not in the public's sight. They can be told apart by their costumes, which allude to their stage names – Pain King wears a gold coronet atop a cowled mask, while Steel Toe has one (right) shoe supposedly made of titanium. Their enthusiastic fans are quite polarized and riots have been known to break out between them. During the Wrestling Wriot: The Smack-down in Middleton event, the two arch foes seemingly put aside their differences on live pay-per-view to work together to help Kim and Ron defeat their magically transformed manager, The Jackal.

Prince Wally
 Voiced by Rob Paulsen
Prince Wallace the Third of Rodeghan was a snobbish, spoiled and arrogant prince of the Kingdom of Rodeghan. Kim was charged with protecting him from the Knights of Rodeghan in "Royal Pain" because of his ancestor's tyrannical behavior toward them. Otherwise royally charismatic and popular, he ends up running for class president against Kim and Brick Flagg (who voted for him) with the help of Ron, who stops being Kim's manager to aid Wally. The prophecy that the monarchy would end with him is fulfilled when he decides to convert his nation into a democracy because of the fun he had with the school election. Although not seen or mentioned again, as he stated his intention to "fulfill my term", he would have remained in Middleton for the rest of the scholastic year.

In the series finale "Graduation Part II", Prince Wally can be seen sitting behind Camille Leone in the United Nations scene where Drakken is receiving a medal.

Private Cleotus Dobbs
 Voiced by Dan Castellaneta
Dobbs was a Private in the US Army charged with guarding a Neutronalizer Ray in "Mind Games". Doctor Drakken kidnapped and switched minds with him to make use of his security clearances to access a top secret military installation and steal the Neutronalizer. Somehow, while still in Drakken's body, he manages to get free long enough to contact Kim for help.

Professor Acari
 Voiced by Maurice LaMarche
Professor Acari is an "insectologist", a name fitting for his profession. Kim recovers the plans for a robot tick which Drakken has stolen from him in "Tick-Tick-Tick". In return, he gives her a ride in China in "The Full Monkey", which makes him special in that he is one of the few people to give Kim a ride where the audience sees exactly what she did to earn the favor. Acari also makes a surprise reappearance in "Roachie". His former lab assistant, Chester Yapsby, had stolen his "roflex" invention, a device to increase the size of insects, and used it for evil.

Professor Ramesh
 Voiced by Brian George
An astronomer, and one of James Possible's old college friends. He is kidnapped by Drakken's creations in "Attack of the Killer Bebes" as revenge for making fun of him in college. He also falls victim to one of Drakken's "silly hats" in "Showdown at the Crooked D". In the series finale, Dr. Possible, his brother Slim, and Professor Ramesh find evidence of vandalism while playing golf at the local country club.

Professor Robert Chen
 Voiced by Gedde Watanabe
An astronomer and one of James Possible's and Doctor "Drew Lipsky" Drakken's old college friends. He is Ramesh's partner, and was the first target for the Bebe robots. He was saved by Kim and her dad. During a cell phone conversation with James Possible just prior to the Lorwardian invasion, his end abruptly goes dead and his fate is never addressed.

Rabbi Katz
 Voiced by Peter Bonerz
Rabbi Katz appears in "Ron the Man"'. Rabbi Katz is Ron's rabbi who performed his Bar Mitzvah. Apparently he forgot to sign Ron's Bar Mitzvah certificate forcing Ron to question if he is really a man. Fortunately, he helps Kim bring Ron to his senses.

Roachie
 Voiced by Frank Welker
Roachie is a cockroach that has been enlarged to the size of a small dog. He was created by Chester Yapsby using the roflex, an invention stolen from Professor Acari. Despite Ron's fear of small insects, he develops a friendship with Roachie. Roachie saves Ron from being stepped on by another giant cockroach and eventually helps turn the giant cockroaches against Chester Yapsby. Kim Possible is disgusted by Roachie, but eventually comes to tolerate him given how much Ron likes him.

Tara
 Voiced by Tara Strong
Tara is a blonde-haired, blue-eyed cheerleader. Popular in her own right, she is one of Bonnie's sycophants. She has a crush on Ron early in season one, kissing him on the cheek after he saves the cheerleaders from Gil "Gill" Moss at Camp Wannaweep in "Sink or Swim". However he is unaware she has a deeper interest in him until "Emotion Sickness" after she has started going out with Josh Mankey. By "Steal Wheels" she is dating an unnamed boy, and in "So the Drama" she attends the prom with Jason Morgan, the basketball team star forward. Tara has on occasion spent time with Kim, but when not at Bonnie's right shoulder, she is most often seen with left-shoulder sycophant and fellow cheerleader, Hope.

Timothy North
 Voiced by Adam West
Timothy North was a former television actor who had played the role of the titular character on the TV superhero show The Fearless Ferret, an allusion to the 1960s TV series Batman starring Adam West. However, his show was canceled after two seasons, so he uses his money to duplicate the set. Over the years, North begins to believe he is the Fearless Ferret, disappearing into his delusions. At a Retro-TV convention, he eventually comes face-to-face with fellow retired and delusional TV actor, Rudolph Farnsworth, who appeared on his show as the villain known as "White Stripe", which brought them back to reality reunited as friends.

Zita Flores
 Voiced by Nika Futterman
Zita is a Hispanic student at Middleton High. She works at a multiplex movie theater in Middleton, usually seen in the ticket booth and initially wearing the name tag "Annie" until hers can be made. Smitten with her, Ron sees nearly every movie showing just to have opportunities to chat with her, which evidently piques her interest as she sees the last movie with him, sharing his popcorn - evidently signaling the start of a relationship. She appears to have been Ron's first serious girlfriend.

Zita is also interested in an online MMORPG computer game called "Everlot", an allusion to EverQuest and the like, playing as a "she-warrior" (Vir-tu-Ron). Although their dating scene was considered as "in the game", she is surprised to find out Ron also plays Everlot. Despite eventually finding out he is really a newb trying to impress her to take their relationship to the next level, she remains willing to hang out with him after they are hijacked and trapped in the game's virtual world.

Zita is not mentioned or seen again until two seasons later in the series finale, "Graduation",  where she is seen apparently dating Felix Renton. However, the Aspen Wand of New Forest, an artifact Ron gave her player character inside Everlot is seen wielded by a warrior woman (bearing no other resemblance to Zita's avatar) in a computer fighting game played by Ron in "Roachie".

Rides
Minor characters in Kim's network whom she has helped during past missions. They typically play no other prominent role besides transporting Kim to her latest mission site. As of season four, the use of rides has dwindled because Kim now has her own vehicle, but she still calls on them on occasions when it is out of service.

Baxter – In "Mind Games" he lets Kim and Ron ride two of his donkeys down into the Grand Canyon in return for Kim performing an emergency delivery for his donkey, Buttercup in the dark, in the rain, during a mudslide. Voiced by Dan Castellaneta.

Bernice – She gives Kim a ride in "Naked Genius" for saving her town from a leaking dam. She gives Kim another ride in "Team Impossible". She apparently has started working with jets since then. Voiced by April Winchell.

Captain Louis – Captain Louis gives Ron a ride to Dr. Drakken's base in the episode A Very Possible Christmas. This episode reveals that Kim saved his boat from sinking, but that Ron exacerbated the trouble by busting the radio and using the navigational chart as a napkin. Fortunately, Louis is unable to remember that Ron was the one who made the mess of things. Voiced by John DiMaggio.

Dallas – He gives Kim a lift to Mount Middleton in "Attack of the Killer Bebes" after aiding him during a car chase. Voiced by Rob Paulsen.

Mr. Geminini – He works for Doctor Bortle. He gives Kim, Ron, and the tweebs a ride to Bortle's lab in "The Twin Factor". He has a twin too, but his brother is in prison. Voiced by Dan Castellaneta.

Gustavo – Gustavo gives Kim and Ron a ride in his plane in "Tick-Tick-Tick" for saving his village from a flood, which it is hinted Ron caused.

Heinrich – He gives Kim a ride in "Crush" after saving his village from an avalanche that Ron accidentally caused. He reappears in "Team Impossible". Voiced by John DiMaggio.

Joe – Helicopter pilot who gives Kim and Ron a ride to the Bebe's hive island off the Gulf Coast of Florida in Queen Bebe. Since Kim is wearing a pair of super-speed shoes during the ride, time began to move so slowly for her that we never find out what favor she carried out in exchange for this ride.

Judd – A camera man who gives Kim a ride to the Seniors' island in the episode "Oh Boyz". Kim had rescued Judd from a rhino stampede earlier, while he was filming a program entitled "Teasing Wild Animals".

Mr. Magnifico – In "Bonding", Mr. Magnifico and his circus company give Kim a ride to a top secret research facility on their train. This is in return for Kim acting as a substitute high-wire acrobat after the original performer twisted her ankle.

Mr. Morrow - voiced by Clancy Brown.

Mrs. Mahoney – Mrs. Mahoney gives Kim her first ride ever for a mission, as seen in A Sitch in Time as payment for saving her cat.

Mr. Parker – In "Bueno Nacho", Mr. Parker flies Kim to Wisconsin in his crop duster after she saves his business by going organic, allowing her to para-drop onto the world's largest Swiss cheese wheel.

Ricardo – In "Gorilla Fist", Ricardo gives Kim a ride to South America in his plane for saving his chicken farm from a mudslide. Presumably, she dried up the mud with her cordless hair dryer.

Unnamed Marine Colonel – He gives Kim a ride to Cambodia in a military transport plane in "Monkey Fist Strikes" after she tips him off to an assault that is due to take place.

Main villains

Dr. Drakken
 Voiced by John DiMaggio
 Portrayed by Todd Stashwick, Maxwell Simkins (young)
Dr. Drakken is Kim Possible's archenemy and the main antagonist. He is a blue-skinned mad scientist and supervillain obsessed with world domination (and with robots and cloning). Of all of Kim's enemies, he and Shego (his implied love interest) are considered her arch-foes. His real name is Drew Theodore P. Lipsky and he is dearly loved by his embarrassing and oblivious mother, Mama Lipsky, though he cannot bring himself to admit the "evil villain out to conquer the world" thing to her. When he was in college he was humiliated by his friends, one of whom was Kim's father, Dr. James Timothy Possible, over his decision to create robots for their dates rather than actually find real girls. He ended up dropping out and becoming a villain to assuage his wounded ego. At some point he turned blue but all that is known about it is that "it was a Tuesday" when it happened.

Although clearly a capable scientist, able to construct hovercraft, robots, laser cannons, mind-bending devices, synthetic henchmen, doomsday weapons, and other such "evil" technologies, Drakken is totally clueless when it comes to making them work correctly and his plans are often undone by his own oversight. For example, he makes his "perfect" Bebe Robots too perfect. They realize he is not perfect and should not command them. He positions super-laser reflectors on the moon so that they reflect the beam right back to their source, destroying the lair he has spent stolen millions on.

Even though Drakken claims to be all evil, at times he has shown his good side and even helped Kim save the world. Even though he frequently encounters Kim and Ron, he can never remember Ron's name. In "The Twin Factor," he does remember which makes Ron happy, and Ron forces him to remember it at the end of "So the Drama". He is always extremely surprised to see Kim show up, even though he is unsure exactly why. In "Graduation" he comes up with a plan that finally works; however, this plan is to save the world rather than to take it over. He plays a major role in defeating the Lorwardians, receiving a UN medal for it. It is implied he reformed, having finally obtained the recognition and respect he long sought, but the series ends before it can be confirmed.

Shego

 Voiced by Nicole Sullivan
 Portrayed by Taylor Ortega
Shego is Dr. Drakken's sidekick, implied love interest, and is by far Kim's most dangerous enemy. She is wanted in several countries; eleven, as noted by Wade during the first episode. She is highly skilled in martial arts and is so stealthy that Drakken accuses her of being sneakier and quieter than ninjas. He later says she is one (however that boastful statement is lost in the "A Sitch in Time" reset), although Shego herself never claims to be one. Ron nurses a slight attraction to her at first sight, but quickly gets over it after seeing how dangerous she is. On many levels, Shego also serves as a foil personality to Kim, even Drakken notes their similarities.

Shego used to be a superheroine alongside her brothers as part of Team Go. All of them were hit by a mysterious rainbow "comet" when they were younger which instilled in each a color-coded glowing superpower; Shego's is green. The properties of her power are never fully defined but have been seen to stun, burn, melt, cut through the strongest metals, and can deliver concussive force. Normally Shego expresses her glow enshrouding her hands and fingers, but she can also range it as a beam (distance unknown), as well as concentrate and toss it like a ball of chi or ball lightning.

Despite the properties of her ability, Shego has a tendency to drop or dial it back during key moments of combat with Kim which would otherwise injure the girl. However, after heavy usage Shego will begin to tire. According to her brother Hego, Shego left their group because the more evil they fought, the more Shego liked the evil and became a villainess. According to Shego, she quit because her brothers were intolerably annoying, a claim that even Hego would later imply to be true, since Shego was responsible for keeping the team focused back then.

Shego has a degree in child development, revealed in "Stop Team Go" when she is a substitute teacher for Kim and Ron's class, having been temporarily turned good. During that time, she and Kim actually end up becoming friends. Even though they are sworn enemies, Shego seems to occasionally care about Kim. When Drakken teams up with the alien Warmonga, Shego saves Kim's life by stopping Warmonga from harming her, and eventually contacts Kim's brothers through the Kimmunicator for help. In the series finale, Shego teams up with Kim, Ron, and Drakken to save the world. Although it is hinted in that same episode, during the medal award ceremony, that she and Drakken became romantically involved, she is not at his table during the final closing credits. It is also implied she is going straight, but that too could not be confirmed as the series ended.

Initially, Shego was meant to be  Dr. Drakken's sidekick, designed with green and black, which are colors the creators considered to be known as "bad colors". However, after hearing Nicole Sullivan's performance as Shego they started to develop her unique relationship with Drakken, as Nicole portrayed Shego as sarcastic and more intelligent than Drakken. This prevailed throughout the series as her trademark. The characters' voice actors had already worked together in Buzz Lightyear of Star Command. Originally, Shego was not included in the initial version of the pilot episode ("Crush") of Kim Possible, but was added in later versions of it.

Monkey Fist
 Voiced by Tom Kane
Lord Monty Fiske is a British nobleman, world-famous explorer, and archaeologist, who became obsessed with monkeys - or rather, with becoming the Monkey King. After training to become a master of Tai Shing Pek Kwar  which teaches two distinct and otherwise unrelated kung fu styles, that of Pek Kwar, or "Ax Hand", and Tai Shing, ("Monkey"; literally: "Monkey Fist"), he then proceeds to spend his family fortune on radical genetic procedures and experimental surgeries to replace his hands and feet with those of a monkey. In the season two episode "Partners", it is revealed the procedures were performed by DNAmy, who developed a crush on Fist, whether this was before or after the procedures is left unsaid.

Kim first meets him when he calls her to Cambodia to retrieve a jade monkey idol from a tomb full of traps and unknowingly completes a set of four such mystical idols in his possession. He then uses them to expose himself to Mystical Monkey Power and styles himself as Monkey Fist, a spoonerism of "Monty Fiske". Aware of the existence of the Yamanouchi Ninja Clan, it is implied he had a history with them which was never fully addressed.

Unlike the other villains, he considers Ron a worthy opponent rather than a clownish sidekick. He considers Ron (and Rufus) as the only others, besides himself, exposed to Mystical Monkey Power. Although Ron considers Monkey Fist his arch-foe, in "Gorilla Fist" Fiske refutes him as at best an arch-bungler. Ron once comments that he is the only one of their regular foes who regularly remembers his name, which he appreciates. He also is the most confrontational of the villains, showing a willingness to battle them directly as opposed to the death traps Drakken and others employ.

Aside from his martial arts skills, greatly enhanced by the increased agility granted by his simian hands and feet, Monkey Fist commands an army of trained monkey ninjas. He is obsessed with increasing his power through various mystical artifacts and prophecies, and becoming a Monkey King. He only once directly fights Ron, who won while three of Fiske's "hands" and his mouth were filled with jade idols, leaving himself open to a dropkick. Every other encounter after this sees Ron either dealing with the monkey ninjas or running away. Kim, however, manages to fight him to stand-stills.

In "Oh No, Yono" Fiske is defeated in his attempt to kidnap Ron's adopted sister Hana, and he turns to stone in fulfillment of a mystical contract to "walk the Path of the Yono". As of the finale episode, "Graduation" and its closing credits, he is still petrified.

Duff Killigan
 Voiced by Brian George
The self-proclaimed "World's Deadliest Golfer", he was banned from every golf course in the world, even miniature golf, for excessive displays of temper. His weapons are his golf clubs and exploding golf balls. He speaks with a Scottish accent, and wears traditional Scottish attire such as a kilt and tam o' shanter. Although he debuted as an independent villain, subsequent appearances show him as more of a mercenary-style individual, committing robberies to sell the stolen objects to others without any real plan for them himself. Killigan makes his home on a private island, dubbed "Killigan's Island" by Ron.

He teams up with Drakken on several occasions when they have a common goal, as well as Monkey Fist at one point in A Sitch in Time (Although since that timeline was erased, as far as anyone is concerned, that particular partnership never happened.) Killigan faces off with Kim on a number of occasions, first when she and Will Du of Global Justice join forces to stop him from turning the entire planet into his own personal golf course. During A Sitch in Time, he joins the other allied villains in traveling to the past in an effort to prevent their future defeats at Kim's hands, though they fail on each occasion. In the dystopic future ruled over by Shego in the film, Killigan becomes Robo-Duff: the World's Deadliest Golfing Cyborg, left with no visible parts of his body remaining except for his head in a wheeled exo-suit that enables him to produce exploding golf balls.

In "Grande Size Me", Duff is among the villains who appear at the HenchCo auction, and express actual concern for Ron upon noticing the sidekick's dramatic weight gain. Later, in "Graduation," Duff is initially suspected of vandalizing various country clubs and golf courses around the world. However, Kim and Ron discover that Duff's island has likewise been marred by a large symbol, which is later revealed to be a Lorwardian emblem foreshadowing their invasion. While Kim investigates, Duff questions Ron about their relationship, exacerbating Ron's growing insecurity over his imminent graduation from high school.

Seniors

Señor Senior, Sr.
 Voiced by Ricardo Montalbán, later Earl Boen
Senior is a retired Spanish multi-billionaire who takes up villainy as a hobby. Many of his schemes revolve around acquiring power or influence for his son, Junior. His usual tactics involve clichéd villainy, such as mastering evil laughter and using an elaborate grand trap to eliminate a foe. Due to his level of cunning, he is Kim's nemesis more than he is considered Ron's. However, of all the villains, Ron likes Senior the most, (or at least hates him the least), because he is one of the few who remembers his name on a regular basis. Being initially harmless, he is not truly evil so much as he is taking up a hobby after being inspired by some careless suggestions and comments by Ron. He is often seen reading and referencing The Book of Evil guidebook. He has set the goal of gaining control of Europe at the very least. He was an action sports icon in his youth, and has shown that he is quite skilled, and very spry for his advanced age. He can pilot helicopters, speedboats, and Jet skis with ease, and although frequently seen with a walking stick, can perform complex acrobatics and maneuvers while running and skydiving.

Señor Senior, Jr.
 Voiced by Néstor Carbonell
Senior Sr.'s son and (sometimes reluctant) accomplice, Junior is a very attractive and stylish, but spoiled man-child, more interested in parties and looking fabulous than in his father's criminal plans. He has demonstrated a soft side on various occasions. He once has a brief crush on Kim Possible because of the zodiac-like principles of Animology. He almost never enters battle, but on the rare occasions he does, he typically fights Ron, likely because he is a weaker fighter than Kim. He expresses a desire to be a boy-band singer and has been tutored in villainy by Shego. He proves a fairly capable fighter when tutored by Shego in the episode "Two to Tutor". He defeats her in a sparring match (although she did not use her powers), and later defeats Ron in a fight that followed. There are also times when he is seen as cunning and clever, such as when he pretends to turn his father into the police, when in reality, he intended to regain their lost fortune through the reward money. Because of his general buffoonery, and the fact that he mainly fights Ron, he is considered Ron's nemesis more than he is considered Kim's. However, like his father, he remembers Ron's name fairly consistently, prompting Ron to like him more than most of the other villains. He begins dating Kim's classmate, Bonnie Rockwaller, early in the final season and is still dating her by the end of the series. However, in the finale coda, Junior's date "Bonnie" is revealed to be Camille Leon.

Professor Dementor
 Voiced and portrayed by Patton Oswalt
A German mad scientist. While he is a threat to Kim and the world, he seems more determined to show up his rival, Dr. Drakken. He is depicted as more competent than Drakken, and his henchmen are more effective as well; however, he still succumbs to certain villainous clichés, a weakness pointed out by Bonnie in the episode "Bonding." Ever since he experienced defeat by Kim's battlesuit, he has turned his focus to stealing it for himself, attempting to acquire it in the episodes "Ill-Suited" and "Larry's Birthday". In "Larry's Birthday" he has a sister named Hildegard who is married to one of his henchmen who is named Myron. In a shared dream, Dementor's family name was "Demenz". It is unclear if that holds true in their "waking" continuity.

Minor villains

Adrena Lynn
 Voiced by Rachel Dratch
A single-episode villain, Adrena Lynn is a TV teen action star who specializes in "extreme" death-defying stunts. In reality, she fakes all of her stunts. She is exposed by Kim and Ron when Kim tries to save Lynn from a failed bungee jump stunt only to discover she did not do the stunt at all and was using a stuffed stunt-double dummy. Her catchphrase is "freaky" in and after sentences, placing extra emphasis on the eaky rather than fr. Her name is an allusion to adrenaline.

Aviarius
 Voiced by Richard Steven Horvitz
A villain with a bird fixation, Aviarius is actually an arch-foe of Team Go. He wears a caped costume with bird-foot-like boots and speaks in an over-the-top, villainous cackle. He has under his command a number of bird-themed weapons, such as flocks of hummingbird-shaped homing missiles and a gigantic robotic flamingo. He also owned a staff which was capable of stealing the powers of Team Go for the wielder to use for themselves, though it was subsequently destroyed, returning the stolen powers to their original owners. Despite the fact that Dr. Drakken cannot remember Ron's name, he still knows who he is when Aviarius tries to portray Ron as himself. Dr. Drakken asks "Where is this Aviarius?" Aviarius replies "Here he is!" referring to Ron. But Ron tells Aviarius "Dude, Dr. Drakken already knows who I am." to which Dr. Drakken replies "Yes, I do know who you are but the name escapes me." This happens in the episode "Go Team Go."

Bates
 Voiced by Jeff Bennett
Bates is Monkey Fist's butler. Desperately loyal, Bates does his job thoroughly to please his master. After gaining mystical monkey power, Monkey Fist begins training an army of monkey ninja warriors. Since then Bates has not returned; and whether or not he is still employed by Monkey Fist remains to be confirmed.

Bebes
 Voiced by Kerri Kenney
A trio of hive-minded, female killer robots. They were built by Drakken, but have since gone rogue. They make Kim's cheer-squad rival Bonnie Rockwaller their "Queen Bebe" even though Bonnie does not know it at the time. With the help of Rufus, who is wearing miniature "super speed shoes," they sabotage their production line so that their heads will be mounted upside down. In their horror at no longer being perfect, the Bebes self-destruct. Kim is able to defeat them and save Bonnie in the end.

"Big Daddy" Brotherson
 Voiced by Maurice LaMarche
A morbidly obese man and one of the criminal underworld's number one information brokers. Kim has once commented that if there is any sort of evil deal taking place, Big Daddy will have his fingerprints all over it. Big Daddy has a weakness for playing mind games with his clients, which he expects them to play along with if they want his help.

Camille Léon
 Voiced by Ashley Tisdale
An heiress and socialite who becomes a villain after being cut off from her family fortune. After having experimental surgery, she has the ability to shape shift ("Trading Faces"). Her name is a play on the word chameleon. Unlike other villains who aim for world domination, Camille only commits her crime to fund her lavish lifestyle, or out of spite and revenge. She has a hairless pet cat named Debutante who has an obsessive crush on Rufus. She is a parody of Paris Hilton, with her appearance (such as her distinctive, long blond hair) and lifestyle (paparazzi, tiny pet, wealth, both been to prison). There are also elements of Sharpay Evans from the High School Musical movies (also played by Tisdale). Camille is friends with fellow celebs, Britina, M.C. Honey, Starlette, and the Holsen twins (parody of Olsen twins).

Chester Yapsby
 Voiced by Stephen Root
A single-appearance villain who tries to take over Middleton with giant cockroaches via the "roflex", an invention stolen from Professor Akari. He is thwarted with the help of Roachie, one of the giant cockroaches he created (and Ron befriended).

DNAmy
 Voiced by Melissa McCarthy
Originally Amy Hall. A bio-geneticist and an avid collector of Cuddle Buddies (small stuffed toys similar to Beanie Babies, except for being hybrid crosses between two separate animals); her favorite being the butterfly-otter hybrid Otterfly. In her obsession, she creates mutant animal hybrids ("life-size, living Cuddle Buddies!"). At one point, has crushes on Mr. Barkin and Drakken, but now has a crush on Monkey Fist, on whom she performed his trademark genetic mutation. She has a bubbly, clingy personality, a rarity for any villain, whether on the series or otherwise.

In season three, she replaces her human body with that of a gorilla, in an attempt to get Monkey Fist to reciprocate her romantic feelings. Instead, he goes into hiding. However, in season four, Amy is back to her own body as seen in "Grande Size Me", when visiting an MHS football game (seen in the bleachers) during "Homecoming Upset", and in the end credits of "Graduation".

Dr. Fen
 Voiced by Tom Kenny
A co-worker of Dr. Possible who works in the robotics department. It is unclear how he obtained this position, as he is actually a rather incompetent roboticist, although it is implied that he got it by stealing his partner's research. All the robots he makes on his own attack him or try to hurt him.

Electronique
 Voiced by Kari Wahlgren
This villainess appears in the episode "Stop Team Go." Her evil genius lies in electrical weapons: as a chipper Shego explains, "If it has wires, she can turn it into a weapon. If it's already a weapon, she can make it a better weapon." Her metallic, wire-like hair crackles with static electricity, her outfit is festooned with wires and conduits to channel her electrical powers, and she can shoot lightning from her gloved hands. She speaks with a vaguely East-European accent.

She draws Team Go (including Shego, who she did not know had quit the team) into a trap to avenge herself and turn the heroes into her "evil minions". Because Shego has already become an evil minion of her own volition, she is instead temporarily turned good, and teams up with Kim to defeat the villainess. After her defeat, Ron uses the Attitudinator to turn her good.

Embarrassment Ninjas
Two silent ninjas employed by Drakken in "Blush". Drakken tries to embarrass Kim out of existence and brings in the deadly pair to speed up the process while she is on a date with Josh Mankey. They come close to succeeding, with unintentional help from Jim and Tim Possible, but Kim is saved by Ron at the last minute.

Evil Eye Trio
Not really villains, but rather a trio of image consultants who advise villains on the look of their lairs and the style of their costumes. Their cable television show Evil Eye for the Bad Guy is a spoof of Queer Eye for the Straight Guy.

Falsetto Jones
 Voiced by Phil Morris
Falsetto Jones is an extremely wealthy man who is known for being the only breeder of Lithuanian Wolfhounds, one of the rarest dog breeds in the world. As described by Wade, Jones is "rich, refined and possibly the world's greatest thief." Wade explains to Kim and Ron that Jones is the prime suspect in many high-profile robberies, but no one has ever been able to find any kind of evidence on him. He appears in the half-length episode, "Rufus in Show," where Team Possible encounters him sometime after he stole a large diamond from a museum exhibit. Kim and Ron use his annual open dog show, with Rufus as an entrant, as cover to recover the diamond. Compared to Kim's recurring enemies, Jones is a much more competent villain, not giving into the clichéd "traditional" methods (such as instead of leaving Kim and Ron to perish in a trap, he chooses to stay and make sure they die). After Ron questions why he is called "Falsetto," Kim explains that he's called this because of his unusually high voice that was caused by a "freak helium accident." While he was not shown in the episode being arrested by the police, the second Game Boy Advance video game confirms that he was later arrested by the police and sent to prison.

Frugal Lucre
 Voiced by Richard Kind
Francis Lurman, AKA "Frugal Lucre", was an employee of the Philadelphia Smarty Mart who, in the episode "Low Budget", threatens to destroy the Internet with a destructive virus unless everyone in the world agrees to pay him a dollar each, thus potentially earning him over six billion dollars. He places this virus on the barcode of a can of expired Vienna sausages, which would be unleashed when scanned. A cost-conscious, budget-minded villain, Frugal Lucre does not need henchmen or a lair. He conducts his evil plans from his mother's basement and threatens his foes with a wading pool full of snapping turtles. After "So the Drama", he is Drakken's cellmate in jail; a torture far worse than ever imaginable. He constantly bothers Drakken with his ideas, even sleep-talking about claiming to kidnap the five richest people in the world without doing so (which Junior and Shego did). He is later released from jail, having served his time; Francis actually bonds with Drakken over the idea of taking control of all the Smarty-Mart drones.

Fukushima
 Voiced by Dante Basco
When Ron is temporarily transferred into the school as part of an exchange program, Fukushima voices his protest, resentful of an outsider being allowed to enter the school. Afterwards, he is shown hazing Ron and laughing whenever he makes a mistake. He later helps Monkey Fist to obtain the Lotus Blade and is defeated by Ron in the climax of the episode.

Gill
 Voiced by Justin Berfield
Real name: Gil Moss. A former camper at Camp Wannaweep. When Ron attended Camp Wannaweep, he swapped Gill his afternoon swim, for arts and crafts. In the episode "Sink or Swim" Gill relates how the polluted lake where he swam in so often caused him to mutate into a fish-man mutant. At the end of "Sink or Swim" Gill is taken away in a fish tank to be cured. Later in "Return to Camp Wannaweep", Gil shows up at Kim's cheerleading camp, cured of his mutation, posing as a mascot for another cheerleading team. Gil appears to want to befriend Ron, who does not trust that he has changed his ways. This turns out to be wise as Gil is actually seeking a source of mutagenic water to return to being "2-L" Gill again. It turns out as much as he hated being a fish-man monster, he hates being returned to normal even more. There is a slight difference in Gill's second form as he is bulkier than in his first. After a brief rampage terrorizing all the cheerleaders, he is again defeated by Ron with the help of Kim, Bonnie, and Mr. Barkin, and taken away in a giant fishbowl.

Hank Perkins
 Voiced by Rob Paulsen
Hank Perkins' first appearance is in the half-length episode "Sick Day" as a temp worker, hired by Duff Killigan after Doctor Drakken and Shego are incapacitated by the flu. In "Odds Man In" he returns as a "villainy consultant" to improve Dr. Drakken's latest global domination scheme.

Jack Hench
 Voiced by Fred Willard
As the head of Hench Co. Industries. Jack Hench does not really see himself as a villain. He has no evil schemes or plans to take over the world. He actually prefers to think of himself as a simple businessman who caters to an exclusive clientele. However, considering that clientele consists of people who do have evil schemes and plans to take over the world, Hench is not going to be a strong contender for Humanitarian of the Year anytime soon. Only the fact that he has never used any of his inventions or weapons himself has managed to keep him safely under everyone's radar and allowed him to stay in business. Considering the nature of that business, Kim would prefer having nothing to do with him at all. She only comes to his aid in the past because it was for the greater good to do so.

Jackie Oakes (a.k.a. Jackie the Jackal)
 Voiced by Bill Barretta
As the founder, chairman and executive promoter of GWA (the Global Wrestling Association), Jackie Oakes made a fortune bringing his brand of sports entertainment into living rooms all over the world. However, promoting the show is not good enough for Jackie. He wants to be part of the show as an actual wrestler. Unfortunately, because of his small size, none of the other athletes in the locker room (especially his two-star performers, Steel Toe and Pain King) take his request seriously. This causes a great deal of resentment in Jackie until one day, he comes across the legend of an unnamed Egyptian amulet. According to myth, the amulet was a gift to Cleopatra herself from a High Priest of Anubis, the Egyptian God of the Dead. Allegedly, whoever wore the amulet was granted superhuman strength and power. He is defeated when Rufus manages to remove the amulet, allowing Pain King and Steel Toe to throw him from the ring.

Malcolm Needius
 Voiced by Martin Spanjers
Malcolm Needius, also known as "The Wraith Master", is a single appearance villain in the episode "Vir-Tu-Ron". He is a hard-core 'power player' in the popular online game Everlot (a parody of EverQuest). He takes his obsession a bit too far and seeks to dominate the game world, ruling it as his online avatar – the Wraith Master. He also tries, unsuccessfully, to win the affections of Zita Flores. He is defeated in the game when everyone gives their power to Zita. Afterwards, Ron comforts him and convinces him to join a club instead.

Motor Ed
 Voiced by John DiMaggio
Dr. Drakken's cousin, considered by Mrs. Lipsky to be the family's "black sheep", and known for his repetitive use of the words "Dude" and "Seriously!". A mechanical engineering genius with a natural understanding of engines of all kinds including rocket motors, he is "widely regarded as the most brilliant mechanical engineer in the country" but left a prestigious job because "the top secret government lab he worked at had a dress code" which did not approve of his mullet and he refused to cut it. He then based himself and his gang at a junkyard in New Jersey.

A male chauvinist with a biker gang motif and an eye for beautiful women, he spends his time playing air guitar and stealing anything which is car related, especially that which will fill his need for speed. Although he is technically a villain who has been imprisoned several times due to his destructive actions and disregard for the law, he seems to have little interest in anything grander than road trips and "tricking out" his various rides.

Nanny Maim
 Voiced by Jane Carr
A former head of an English academy for nannies, her school went out of business as the practice of using strict nannies to raise children became less fashionable. She develops a machine that turns people into super strong babies and begin to steal pacifiers, holding them for ransom. Kim is able to defeat Nanny Maim by using her own babysitting skills to pacify her minions, then revert them to their original age with her machine. She also likes to treat adults like babies.

Sheldon Director (a.k.a.: Gemini)
 Voiced by Maurice LaMarche
Sheldon Director is the brother of Betty Director (known as Dr. Director). The evil head of WEE (the Worldwide Evil Empire), Gemini has dedicated his existence to the extermination of the espionage group, Global Justice (GJ). He seeks this goal despite the fact that he is actually the fraternal twin brother of Dr. Director, the leader of GJ. While Gemini claims to be Dr. Director's "evil twin", his true motive for evil is that because he was born first, he wanted her to treat him like an older brother and she never did. Thus, Gemini chose to become evil and founded WEE just to spite her. He has a prosthetic right hand that fires finger-tipped missiles. He tends to punish his underlings for a single failure by having them sit on a chair and dropped down a hole. He first encounters Kim and Ron when he learns that GJ is investigating a phenomenon called "The Ron Factor" (essentially, the chaos Ron seems to trigger wherever he goes, which GJ theorized was the true reason for Kim's success at saving the world). Upon learning this, Gemini kidnaps Ron and tries to make him a member of WEE. Kim is knocked out by a falling laser, but fortunately, she recovers and is able to rescue Ron along with Dr. Director and together, they are able to defeat Gemini. Gemini has made a cameo appearance in "Grande Size Me".

Snowy
 Voiced by Phil Morris
He is the original snowman. A freak blizzard gives life to him and he gets toxic powers and the nickname "Toxic Snowman". It is discovered that a news anchor named Summer Gale used a weather machine to cause a snowstorm so that she would get more airtime. However, she created the storm using water from Lake Wannaweep, which is known for creating mutants. Kim and Ron must get to the weather and stop all the Mutant Snowmen before it is too late. Snowy himself emerges after the Possibles destroy the Toxic Snowmen army, but is destroyed when Kim and Ron cause the sun to come out, melting Snowy.

Summer Gale
 Voiced by Hallie Todd
Summer Gale is a news anchor who was getting less and less time on television because of her age. She manages to gain some temporary fame covering a blizzard that hits Middleton. Middleton is hit with a different threat: Snowy. The snowmen attacked Summer Gale while she is on the air. Kim manages to rescue her. It is later revealed that Summer Gale had used a weather machine to create the blizzard in the hope of getting more airtime. She also used the toxic water from Lake Wannaweep to make the snowmen. Kim and Ron disable the weather machine. It is not known if Summer Gale is still on the air.

Sumo Ninja
  Voiced by Kevin Michael Richardson
A hulking ninja who combines the size and weight of a sumo wrestler with the speed and agility of a ninja. He usually speaks in a deep, threatening voice. While working for Dr. Drakken, attempting to kidnap Mr. Nakasumi, he is knocked down by Kim Possible and receives an atomic wedgie from Ron Stoppable. Days or weeks later, he is still speaking in a high, squeaky voice as a result, though he has lost none of his speed or agility. Weakened by exposure to Kim's patent knockout gas, he is knocked unconscious by an inadvertent punch from Ron.

The Fashionistas
 Voiced by Charlie Schlatter (Chino), Tara Strong (Espadrille), and Gwendoline Yeo (Hoodie)
Chino (the male), Espadrille (female with short, black hair), and Hoodie (in the hood), that are collectively known as The Fashionistas, a group of Fashion-obsessed criminals. Though they seem like villainous fashion designers, all three are actually superb at combat, with Hoodie perhaps being the strongest fighter of the three. They are encountered in "Fashion Victim," when Kim and Monique face off with them to retrieve secret Club Banana designs stolen by Camille Léon. They reappear, briefly, in "Clothes Minded" when Kim is looking for a new mission outfit design. Though she rejects their offer to make the outfit because they were asking for too much in return, she does wind up using their design later on.

The Knights of Rodeghan
 Voiced by Corey Burton and Brian George
Long ago, the kingdom of Rodeghan was run by a ruthless monarch who was so despotic that even his knights hated him. Since then the knights have followed an ancient prophecy predicting that the King's lineage will end with Prince Wally, the future King Wallace III. However, like most prophesies, there is more than one interpretation; Wally would be the last royal but he would become an elected leader and not be killed.

The Mathter
 Voiced by Brian Stepanek
The Mathter first appeared in the season four episode "Mathter and Fervent". He is one of the three known foes of Team Go, a 1970s cartoon-styled villain whose name is a combination of the words "math" and "master". He became a villain after he was denied funding for his "unethical mathematical experiments" and uses a copter hat to escape his foes. His primary weapon is a "calcu-laser" and he uses math puns in almost every sentence, much to Kim's annoyance. He is defeated by Ron's father in battle in his Infinity Dome as Ron's dad is an actuary and is able to match him calculation for calculation.

Vinnie Wheeler
 Voiced by Max Casella
Vinnie Wheeler is hired by Señor Senior, Senior as a financial consultant to instill in his son a measure of financial responsibility. But Vinnie is actually a con man. He convinces Señor Senior Junior to grant him power of attorney, then steals their entire fortune, leaving The Seniors destitute for a short period of time.

Warmonga
 Voiced By: Kerri Kenney
An alien, nine-foot-tall, green-skinned, warrior woman from the planet Lorwardia. Tracking down the source of a months-old television commercial, Rappin' Drakken, Warmonga arrives on Earth believing Dr. Drakken is "The Great Blue", a legendary leader whom she is seeking and to whom she will pledge her allegiance and arsenal of advanced weaponry. She is a fierce fighter, extremely strong, and very eager-to-please; though she can be very literal-minded when following orders. Warmonga's name is an allusion to the word "warmonger", while the name of her home planet, Lorwardia, is a spoonerism of the word "warlord'".

She proves too much in her first appearance for the combined forces of Kim and Shego, but leaves when tricked by Jim or Tim Possible in a video message posing as the "real Great Blue", actually a Pep Puppy costume colored blue either by dye or video filtering, waiting for her at "Bluto" (Pluto). She later returns in "Graduation" with Warhok for revenge at being fooled and is temporarily defeated by Drakken who traps her with flowering vines. She gets free and plans to take Kim home as a trophy, which angers Ron into summoning the Mystical Monkey Power to battle Warhok. Warmonga stays to the side of the fight until the end, jumping in to attack Ron at the same time as Warhok. This proves to be a mistake, as Ron grabs both Lorwardians, throwing them high into the sky into their crashing space cruiser, which explodes, apparently killing them.

Warhok
 Voiced by Ron Perlman
A leader in the Lorwardian Army and Warmonga's hot-tempered battlemate. He serves as the main antagonist of the series finale. Defeated at first by Kim, he is tangled up in flowers but frees himself. He knocks out Shego and bats Ron out of the way and into Kim, knocking her unconscious. He prepares to take Kim home as a trophy. He then battles an angry Ron and is apparently killed when Ron throws him into his ship which then explodes.

White Stripe
 Voiced by John C. McGinley
Rudolph Farnsworth, also known as "White Stripe" is a single appearance villain who appears in season two. He, like his fellow actor Timothy North, has come to believe the Fearless Ferret television show is reality. Since he plays a villain in the show he believes he is the villain in real life. When Ron dons the Fearless Ferret costume he comes out of hiding to battle him. He realizes at the end of the episode that "White Stripe" was not real and reconciled with Timothy North.

Yono the Destroyer
 Voiced by Clancy Brown
A villain introduced in the season four episode "Oh No! Yono!". Released by Monkey Fist to help him find the "weapon". After making a pact, Yono goes to Yamanouchi where he easily takes care of Kim, Rufus, and Master Sensei, turning them all to stone. When Hana beats his summoner, Monkey Fist, everyone is returned to normal and Monkey Fist himself is turned to stone and sucked into the earth as he followed the "Path of the Yono".

Zorpox The Conqueror
The name Zorpox the Conqueror came from Issue 97 of the Villains' League of Evil Villains, a comic book owned by Wade. Ron was wearing a Zorpox costume to infiltrate HenchCo's Evil Trade Fair when he was turned evil by a device called the "Attitudinator". This helmet-like device swapped his inner evil with Dr Drakken's, who was the previous wearer. Much later the villainess Electronique enhances the Attitudinator into a morality "Reverse Polarizer" that Ron falls victim to, again unlocking his inner evil. Evil Ron is arguably the most dangerous villain of the series, even impressing Shego with his diabolical know-how, visibly enhanced fighting skills, and going so far as to threaten to dump her in a shark tank - a prospect which scared her into subservience. However, despite keeping the comic book character's costume, after being Attitudinated, Evil Ron never was referred to as "Zorpox" by either himself or others, perhaps because he didn't think of himself as Zorpox, but rather thought of himself as evil Ron. While Evil he has as his distinctive musical theme: "Toccata and Fugue in D Minor" by Johann Sebastian Bach.

Supporting characters
Middleton High School cheerleaders
Along with Kim, Bonnie, and Tara, the other main cheerleaders at Middleton High include: Crystal (short wavy brown hair), Jessica (long straight blonde hair), Liz (short wavy red hair with purple headband), Hope (long black hair, no mole) and Marcella (long black hair, mole). However, throughout the series, there are glimpses of plenty of other cheerleaders, a few of whom have taken part in First Squad practices and routines, indicating the existence of secondary, tertiary or more squads.

Contrary to the common stereotype of school cheerleaders being mean, rude and snobby, Bonnie is truly the only mean-spirited member of the squad throughout the series. All the other cheerleaders (including Kim) are actually pretty nice.

Bonnie Rockwaller
 Voiced by Kirsten Storms, Kelly Ripa (future version in Kim Possible: A Sitch In Time'')
 Portrayed by Erika Tham
Kim's classmate at Middleton High School and her rival in almost every aspect, Bonnie has a dismissive and superior attitude toward Kim, Ron, and people in general, whom she generally considers to be beneath her. She is constantly concerned with the high school's "food chain," and her standing on it which she apparently perceives is challenged by Kim's position as the school cheerleading captain as well as her massive popularity. In addition to hanging out with the popular seniors, going so far as to save seats at lunch for the even more popular Amelia, Bonnie dates the football team's star quarterback, Brick Flagg off and on, for the status bestowed by this relationship. She later dates Hirotaka and then Señor Senior Junior who is her boyfriend for the remainder of the series.

Throughout the series, Bonnie constantly challenges Kim's position both in routines and as captain. In "Number One," she works hard enough to gain enough popularity to swing a vote and become the new captain. However, after Kim throws her own vote in support of Bonnie's bid, and explains that the hard work as captain was only just beginning, Bonnie has second thoughts. It is unknown exactly how long Bonnie remains captain before handing the position back to Kim, who had estimated it would be "two weeks tops". Since then Bonnie is never as vocal about taking the captain's position from Kim, but still angles for prominence in routines, once even ready to take the top of the pyramid when Kim blows a lay-up.

Bonnie has two older sisters who frequently pick on her, saying that Lonnie got the beauty and Connie got the brains, and Bonnie got the rest. Connie and Lonnie's only appearance in the entire series is in the third-season episode, "Bonding", when it is strongly implied that Bonnie's sour disposition stems from her sisters always being so mean to her. The mother of the Rockwaller sisters makes her only appearance in the first-season episode, "Downhill", and is shown to be a source of consternation and embarrassment for her youngest daughter. Bonnie is humiliated when her mother calls her "Pumpkin" and "Bon-Bon", but Ron is highly amused by this, and teasingly calls Bonnie "Bon-Bon" whenever he gets the chance.

Bonnie has a strange relationship with Ron throughout the series, repeatedly calling him "loser" and generally putting him down at every opportunity. However, she calls him a "hottie" when he becomes a multimillionaire in "Ron Millionaire". But at the start of the fourth season, Bonnie advises Kim to dump Ron, claiming it is practically a rule for cheerleaders to date jocks, especially since they have just started their senior year of high school. Bonnie also kisses him when Brick breaks up with her, but then breaks down until Kim promises to help her find a new boyfriend.

At the end of the series, Bonnie is revealed to be the only senior in Kim and Ron's class who is unable to graduate, due to missing an important pop quiz a week before graduation, thus leaving her one credit short. Bonnie had blown off all her classes the last week of school due to her belief that nothing important ever happens during that time, and she has to go to summer school to graduate. Bonnie is very upset about this but cheers up when her boyfriend, Señor Senior Junior, says he would be there in spirit during summer school while his actual self would be lounging by his pool. 
In Homecoming Upset Kim was ready to promotion to be cheerleader queen and Ron was cheerleader king but Bonnie cheated and when he stated that Kim was the girl for him. before bonnie forcefully kissed him and Kim was shocked realised that she was try to make her jealous, she confronted them saying is getting twelve stinking years to kiss her. Then she demanded Bonnie for that reason, she sank to her knees and crying admitted that she was got be dumped by Brick because Bonnie was with Ron he broke up with her that Ron realised he was rebound guy to Bonnie. And in the end Bonnie and Senior Jr started dating once more and Ron and Kim were happy for her.

Though neither she nor Kim likes to admit it, they make a good team, using all of their knowledge and skills as cheerleaders to best stronger enemies. This can be seen in Gill's defeat in "Sink or Swim" and in "Bonding", where Kim and Bonnie get stuck together. Kim is forced to take Bonnie with her on a mission and the two girls flawlessly perform together to best Dementor with their acrobatics.

Steven Barkin
 Voiced by Patrick Warburton
 Portrayed by Michael P. Northey
School teacher with a running gag that he is the substitute teacher of practically every subject at Middleton High, even subjects he is not particularly familiar with. He frequently chaperones at field trips and school events, is an avid rugby player, and always refers to students by their last names. He works at "Smarty Mart," was the football coach, spent two years of his senior year in high school, and is the son of Franklin Barkin, who bore a strong resemblance to Benjamin Franklin. It is also revealed that he served in an unspecified war where he achieved the rank of lieutenant. He also develops a crush on Shego while she is Miss Go, which makes things extremely awkward for Ron and Kim. In "Graduation," he indicates that he was like Ron at one point, saving the world while being at the top of things, but it did not work out for him. Also like Ron, Mr. Barkin is loaded with eccentric fears, such as: aliens or robots taking over the world, and mutant weiner-dogs. He and Ron seem to share a frenemy type relationship, with Barkin skeptically viewing Ron's investment in shared activities like football, the Pixie Scouts, and the Middleton Days Festival. Yet occasionally he treats Ron with respect when the two have a common interest or goal. This goes unaddressed so as to maintain Barkin's neutral role as mentor or obstacle for Ron.

References

 
Lists of characters in American television animation
Lists of children's television characters

hu:Mrs. Dr. Possible